Reinoud II may refer to:

 Reinoud II of Guelders (c. 1295 – 1343)
 Reinoud II van Brederode (1415–1473)